Florence Rita Arrey (born 1948) is a Cameroonian judge who was the first female Chief Justice of the Court of the Appeal. She has served on the Supreme Court of Cameroon, and is a Vice President of the International Criminal Tribunal for Rwanda. In 2014, she was appointed Director of Judicial Professions in the Cameroonian Ministry of Justice.

Early life and education
Arrey was born in Cameroon on 18 May 1948. She studied law at the University of Lagos, Nigeria and has a Diploma in Legal Drafting and a Certificate in International Law from the University of London.

Career
Arrey was the first woman to be appointed State Counsel in Cameroon in 1974. She was appointed to the Court of Appeal in 1984 and in 1990 became the first woman appointed Chief Justice. In 2000, she was appointed to the Supreme Court of Cameroon.

Arrey was elected an ad litem Judge of the International Criminal Tribunal for Rwanda (ICTR) by the United Nations General Assembly in 2003. In 2012, she was elected Vice President of the ICTR and Judge of the Mechanism for International Criminal Tribunals.

In 2014, Arrey was appointed Director of Judicial Professions in the Ministry of Justice Cameroon. She is President and founder of the Cameroon Association of Women Judges and Vice President of the International Association of Women Judges.

On International Women's Day in 2011, Arrey was named one of Cameroon's 50 most influential women.

Works

See also
List of the first women holders of political offices in Oceania

References

External links
 International Association of Women Judges Introduction

Living people
1948 births
University of Lagos alumni
Cameroonian judges
Women chief justices
International Criminal Tribunal for Rwanda judges
Cameroonian judges of United Nations courts and tribunals